Lehtmetsa is a village in Järva Parish, Järva County in Estonia. As of 2011 Census, the settlement's population was 39.

References

Villages in Järva County